Huang Huang (born August 1933) is a Chinese Communist politician who served as party secretary of Anhui from 1984 to 1986 and party secretary of Ningxia from 1989 to 1997.

He was a member of the 12th and 14th Central Committee of the Chinese Communist Party. He was a delegate to the 6th and 7th National People's Congress. He was a member of the Standing Committee of the 9th and 10th Chinese People's Political Consultative Conference.

Biography
He has five siblings.

Huang joined the Chinese Communist Party (CCP) in 1949. He was assigned to east China's Anhui province in 1953.  He was made party secretary of Wangjiang County in 1960. In 1966, the Cultural Revolution broke out, he was removed from office and effectively sidelined. He was sent to the May Seventh Cadre Schools to do farm works in Feixi County in December 1969. He was reinstated in July 1972 as director of Publicity Department of the CCP Anhui Provincial Committee. He became first deputy party secretary of Wuwei County in April 1978. He was appointed party secretary of Huoqiu County in 1980 and was admitted to member of the Standing Committee of the CCP Lu'an Municipal Committee, the city's top authority. In December 1984, he was promoted to become party secretary of Anhui, a position he held until April 1986. 

He was chosen as vice governor of Jiangxi in July 1987, after 34 years working in Anhui province. 

He became party secretary of Ningxia in December 1989, and served until August 1997.

References

1933 births
Living people
People from Lianshui County
People's Republic of China politicians from Jiangsu
Chinese Communist Party politicians from Jiangsu
Members of the 12th Central Committee of the Chinese Communist Party
Members of the 14th Central Committee of the Chinese Communist Party
Delegates to the 6th National People's Congress
Delegates to the 7th National People's Congress
Members of the Standing Committee of the 9th Chinese People's Political Consultative Conference
Members of the Standing Committee of the 10th Chinese People's Political Consultative Conference